Tang-e Koleh (also Romanized as Tang-e Kalleh, Tang Kalah, and Tang Kalleh) is a village in Efzar Rural District, Efzar District, Qir and Karzin County, Fars Province, Iran. At the 2006 census, its population was 254, in 61 families.

References 

Populated places in Qir and Karzin County